Yvonne Alice Curtet (née Chabot; born 28 May 1920) is a French former athlete, who specialized in the long jump. She was born in Cannes.

Curtet took eighth place in the long jump during the 1948 London Olympics with a leap of 5.35 m.  In qualifying for the final, she established the first Olympic record for women with a jump of 5.64 m. She also competed at the 1950 European Athletics Championships and placed fourth at that competition. Her second Olympic appearance resulted in a 23rd-place finish at the 1952 Summer Olympics.

Curtet won three French national long jump titles (1945, 1946 and 1949) and two titles in the pentathlon (1946 and 1949). She improved three times the French record in the long jump, bringing it to 5.64 m and 5.67 m in 1948, then 5.71 m in 1949.

Her daughter Jacqueline Curtet succeeded her to the French title and also broke the French record and represented France at the European Athletics Championships with her mother. They were the first mother/daughter combination to have competed in the same event at the European Championships.

As of January 2023, she is the oldest living Olympian.

National titles
 French Championships in Athletics
Long jump: 1945, 1946, 1949
Women's pentathlon: 1946, 1949

Personal records

References

 Docathlé2003, Fédération française d'athlétisme, 2003, p. 395

1920 births
Living people
French centenarians
Sportspeople from Cannes
French female long jumpers
French pentathletes
Olympic athletes of France
Athletes (track and field) at the 1948 Summer Olympics
Athletes (track and field) at the 1952 Summer Olympics
Women centenarians